Hao Peng (born July 1960) is a Chinese politician and business executive, currently serving as Communist Party secretary of Liaoning. He served as the governor of Qinghai province between 2013 and 2016, and prior to that, a vice chairman of Tibet Autonomous Region. He additionally served as the chairman of the State-owned Assets Supervision and Administration Commission (SASAC) between 2019 and 2023.

Career

Education and industry
Hao Peng is a native of Fengxiang County, Shaanxi province. He entered the work force in January 1976 as a sent-down youth in Weiyuan County, Gansu province.

After the Cultural Revolution, in October 1978 Hao entered Northwestern Polytechnical University in Xi'an, Shaanxi, majoring in aircraft manufacturing. He joined the Chinese Communist Party in March 1982 and graduated in July 1982.

After university Hao Peng joined the Aviation Industry Corporation of China, working at its flight control system factory in Lanzhou, Gansu.  He started as a technician, becoming the Director of the factory in 1994, a position he held for five years.

Government
In February 1999 Hao Peng began his government career, becoming the Deputy Director of the Economic and Trade Committee of Gansu province.  In August 2000 he was appointed Vice Mayor of the provincial capital Lanzhou.

Hao Peng was transferred to Tibet Autonomous Region in November 2003, where he was appointed Vice Chairman (governor).  In 2006 he was promoted to Deputy Communist Party Chief and Executive Vice Chairman of Tibet.

In March 2013 Hao Peng was transferred again, to become the Deputy Communist Party Chief and Acting Governor of neighbouring Qinghai province. He succeeded the outgoing governor Luo Huining, who had been appointed the provincial party chief.  In April Hao was officially elected Governor by the Qinghai Provincial Congress. In December 2016, he was appointed as the CCP Secretary of the State-owned Assets Supervision and Administration Commission. He was also appointed the Chairman of SASAC in May 2019.

In November 2022 Hao Peng was transferred to become the Communist Party Secretary of Liaoning. On 3 February 2023, he was replaced by Zhang Yuzhuo as the chairman of the State-owned Assets Supervision and Administration Commission.

Hao is an alternate member of the 18th Central Committee of the Chinese Communist Party, and a full member of the 19th Central Committee.

References

Living people
1960 births
Governors of Qinghai
Chinese Communist Party politicians from Shaanxi
People's Republic of China politicians from Shaanxi
Political office-holders in Tibet
Northwestern Polytechnical University alumni
Businesspeople from Shaanxi
Politicians from Baoji
Alternate members of the 18th Central Committee of the Chinese Communist Party
Members of the 19th Central Committee of the Chinese Communist Party
Members of the 20th Central Committee of the Chinese Communist Party